Farma 12 - City vs Village is the twelfth season of the Slovak version of The Farm reality television show based on the Swedish television series of the same name. The show began filming in August 2020 and premiered on August 31, 2020 on Markíza.

Format
Twenty contestants are chosen from the outside world. This year's twist is City vs Village. In each team there are ten contestants. Contestants live together on a farm but in two groups. Richer city part have some benefits from city life and poorer village part has harder conditions. In first week contestants from Team City are entered to the Village part of farm and contestants from Team Village are entered to the City part. After two weeks teams swap places.

Nomination process
In the first few weeks, only contestants who live in the Village got to choose the Farmer of the Week and Butlers. Those in the City can choose their Farmer of the Week but they don't need to. From butlers team will choose duelist for their team and second team must vote for another duelist. In the duel they need 3 points to survive, otherwise they're evicted from the farm. After 3rd week, evicted farmer chooses Farmer of the Week.

Chalúpka
After losing the duel, the evicted contestant doesn't go home. Instead, they are taken to a secret place across the lake called Chalúpka where he or she will stay and will be joined by other evicted contestants and they will wait for their chance for return.

Contestants
Ages stated are at time of contest.

Nominations

The game

References

External links
http://farma.markiza.sk
Farma Markíza 

The Farm (franchise)
2020 Slovak television seasons